Cartoon Alley is an American animated children's animated anthology series which aired on Turner Classic Movies on Saturday mornings from 2004 to 2008. It featured classic animated shorts.

Originally broadcast at 11:30 AM ET, it was hosted by Ben Mankiewicz and usually featured three classic animated shorts from the 1930–1950s per episode. Most shorts were from The Golden Age of American animation. Each of the three shorts focused on a common theme. Most shorts came from Warner Bros., MGM, Universal, Paramount, Pat Sullivan, and Otto Mesmer (the latter studio provided the Popeye cartoons and the Felix The Cat cartoons only; these were in Turner's hands by this point), but during the show's first season Cartoon Alley featured shorts from the Gaumont Film Company. Many recognizable characters were featured in at least one episode such as Bugs Bunny, Woody Woodpecker, Popeye, Felix The Cat, Porky Pig, Andy Panda, Space Mouse, Tom and Jerry, Droopy, Screwy Squirrel, Barney Bear, Spike, George and Junior, and others not so famous such as Goopy Geer, Betty Boop, Mutt and Jeff, Hunky and Spunky, Little Lulu, Gabby, The Captain and the Kids, and also include animated feature films. The shorts often appeared uncut and uncensored (a few cartoons utilized cuts for content), and the more controversial cartoons (such as Hiawatha's Rabbit Hunt and Half-Pint Pygmy) were often introduced with a brief warning by Mankiewicz about the ethnic stereotypes being portrayed. The network's logo was only featured for a brief time, usually during the last short featured.

From November 2004 to September 2005, the series was featured just once a month but after popular demand the series became a weekly feature. Cartoon Alley usually did not air in February because of TCM's 31 Days of Oscar programming. the series was cancelled in Autumn of 2008.

Episode list

Season 1: 2004-2005

Season 2: 2005-2006

Season 3: 2006-2007
{| class="wikitable"
|+
|-
| 35
| George and Junior
|
 Henpecked Hoboes
 Hound Hunters
 Half-Pint Pygmy
| 11/4/2006
|-
| 36
| Early Bugs Bunny
|
 A Wild Hare'''
 Elmer's Pet Rabbit Hiawatha's Rabbit Hunt| 11/11/2006
|-
| 37
| Spike
|
 The Counterfeit Cat Ventriloquist Cat Garden Gopher| 11/18/2006
|-
| 38
| Bugs and Cecil
|
 Tortoise Beats Hare Tortoise Wins By a Hare Rabbit Transit| 11/25/2006
|-
| 39
| Happy Harmonies II
|
 When the Cat's Away Lost Chick, The Calico Dragon, The| 12/2/2006
|-
| 40
| Porky Pig
|
 Porky's Picnic Porky's Baseball Broadcast Porky's Snooze Reel| 12/9/2006
|-
| 41
|  Bing Crosby Spoofs
|
 Let It Be Me Bingo Crosbyana Woods Are Full of Cuckoos| 12/16/2006
|-
| 42
| Christmas III
|
 Toyland Broadcast Alias St. Nick Captain's Christmas| 12/23/2006
|-
| 43
| Goopy Geer
|
 Goopy Gear Moonlight for Two The Queen Was in the Parlor| 12/30/2006
|-
| 44
| The Bear Family
|
 Goldilocks and the Three Bears A Rainy Day Papa Gets the Bird| 1/6/2007
|-
| 45
| Beans
|
 Fire Alarm, The Phantom Ship, The Boom Boom| 1/13/2007
|-
| 46
| Adolph Hitler WB Caricatures
|
 Daffy - the Commando Russian Rhapsody Herr Meets Hare| 1/20/2007
|-
| 47
| Screwy Squirrel
|
 Screwball Squirrel Screwy Truant, The Lonesome Lenny| 1/27/2007
|-
| 48
| Woody Woodpecker
|
 Pantry Panic Screwball, The Coo Coo Bird, The| 3/6/2007
|-
| 49
| Felix The Cat
|
 Goose that Laid the Golden Egg, The Bold King Cole Neptune Nonsense| 3/13/2007
|-
| 50
| Andy Panda
|
 Life Begins With Andy Panda Mouse Trappers Painter and the Pointer, The| 3/20/2007
|-
| 51
| Andy Panda
|
 Life Begins With Andy Panda Mouse Trappers Painter and the Pointer, The| 3/27/2007
|-
| 52
| Space Mouse
|
 Space Mouse Mouse Trapped| 4/1/2007
|-
|53
|Chuck Jones' Classics
|
 The Dot and the Line The Bear that Wasn't The Tom and Jerry Cartoon Kit|4/10/2007
|-
|54
|Mutt and Jeff
|
 Slick Sleuths Westward Whoa|4/30/2007
|-
|55
|Betty Boop
|
 Bimbo's Initiation Not Now Popeye the Sailor|5/28/2007
|-
|56
|Van Beuren's Tom and Jerry
|
 The Tuba Tooter Plane Dumb Pencil Mania|6/17/2007
|-
|57
|Cartoon Movie Classics
|
 Animal Farm Mr. Bug Goes to Town Gulliver's Travels
 1001 Arabian Nights Popeye the Sailor Meets Sindbad the Sailor|7/4/2007
|-
|58
|Black and White Felix the Cat
|
 April Maze Forty Winks Tee Time Skulls and Sculls Oceantics Felix the Cat Woos Whoopee|8/10/2007
|-
|59
|Hunky and Spunky
|
 Hunky and Spunky Always Kickin' The Barnyard Brat A Kick in Time Snubbed by a Snob You Can't Shoe a Horse Fly Vitamin Hay|9/11/2007
|-
|60
|Count Screwloose
|
 Jitterbug Follies Wanted: No Master|10/31/2007
|-
|61
|Cartoon Movie Classics II
|
 Popeye the Sailor Meets Ali Baba's Forty Thieves Magic Boy Fantasia Aladdin and His Wonderful Lamp|11/12/2007
|-
|62
|Little Lulu
|
 Lulu's Birthday Party A Bout with a Trout Bargain Counter Attack Eggs Don't Bounce|12/1/2007
|-
|63
|Popeye IIII
|
 Morning, Noon and Nightclub I'm in the Army Now What--No Spinach? A Date to Skate Never Sock a Baby|12/31/2007
|-
|64
|Gabby
|
 King for a Day The Constable All's Well Two for the Zoo Swing Cleaning Fire Cheese Gabby Goes Fishing It's a Hap-Hap-Happy Day|1/5/2008
|-
|65
|Rainbow Parade
|
 The Sunshine Makers Parrotville Old Folks The Picnic Panic The Merry Kittens Toonerville Trolley|1/17/2008
|-
|66
|Molly-Moo Cow
|
 Molly Moo-Cow and the Butterflies|1/25/2008
|-
|67
|Woody Woodpecker II
|
 Woody Dines Out The Dippy Diplomat The Loose Nut|3/9/2008
|-
|}

Featured directors
These people directed original shorts featured in the series.
 Tex Avery
 Joseph Barbera
 Robert Clampett
 Arthur Davis
 Earl Duvall
 David Hand (Animalland)
Max Fleischer
 Dave Fleischer
 Friz Freleng
 William Hanna
 Hugh Harman
 Rudolph Ising
 Chuck Jones
 Seymour Kneitel
 Dick Lundy
 Robert McKimson
 Isadore Sparber
 Walter Lantz
 Pat Sullivan
 Otto Messmer

See alsoThe Tex Avery ShowToonHeadsThe Bob Clampett ShowThe Popeye ShowThe Woody Woodpecker ShowThe Ink and Paint Club''

References

External links
 

2000s American animated television series
2000s American anthology television series
2004 American television series debuts
2008 American television series endings
American children's animated anthology television series
English-language television shows
Turner Classic Movies original programming